Eugen Sidorenco (born 19 March 1989) is a Moldovan professional footballer who plays as a left winger for Zimbru Chișinău.

Club career

FC Zimbru
In 2007, Sidorenco signed for Moldovan club FC Zimbru Chişinău.

In the summer of 2013, Sidorenco signed for Russian Premier League side FC Tom Tomsk from Liga Leumit side Hapoel Nazareth Illit.

International career
On 26 May 2010, he made his debut for the Moldova national football team in a friendly match against Azerbaijan.

International goals
On 14 June 2013, Sidorenco scored twice as Moldova beat Kyrgyzstan 2–1 in a home friendly. He scored the first and last goals of the game.

Scores and results list Moldova's goal tally first.

International

References

External links

1989 births
Living people
Footballers from Chișinău
Moldovan footballers
Moldova international footballers
Association football forwards
FC Zimbru Chișinău players
Hapoel Nof HaGalil F.C. players
FC Tom Tomsk players
FC Khimik Dzerzhinsk players
FC Milsami Orhei players
ACS Poli Timișoara players
KF Vllaznia Shkodër players
Suwaiq Club players
Moldovan Super Liga players
Russian Premier League players
Liga Leumit players
Liga II players
Moldovan expatriate footballers
Expatriate footballers in Israel
Expatriate footballers in Russia
Expatriate footballers in Romania
Expatriate footballers in Albania
Expatriate footballers in Oman
Moldovan expatriate sportspeople in Israel
Moldovan expatriate sportspeople in Russia
Moldovan expatriate sportspeople in Romania
Moldovan expatriate sportspeople in Albania
Moldovan expatriate sportspeople in Oman
Asteras Vlachioti F.C. players